West Texas High School is a public high school in Stinnett, Texas (USA). In 1987 three great schools and communities, Plemons, Stinnett and Phillips joined forces to create the Plemons-Stinnett-Phillips Consolidated Independent School District.  Three mascots, the Plemons Indians, Stinnett Rattlers and the Phillips Blackhawks were blended together to create the Comanches.  The campuses of the district, West Texas Elementary School, West Texas Middle School and West Texas High School are all united as Comanches. The school is classified as a 2A school by the UIL. In 2015, the school was rated "Met Standard" by the Texas Education Agency.

Athletics
The West Texas Comanches compete in these sports 

Baseball 
Basketball 2018 2A UIL State Champs
Cross Country
Football
Golf
Powerlifting
Softball
Tennis
Track and Field
Volleyball

State Titles
One Act Play - 
1994(2A), 1997(2A), 1998(2A)

2A Boys Basketball State Championship **2018

References

External links
Plemons/Stinnett/Phillips Consolidated ISD
Phillips High School Alumni website

Schools in Hutchinson County, Texas
Public high schools in Texas